Lamentation over the Dead Christ is a  tempera on panel painting by Giovanni Bellini kept at the Uffizi Gallery in Florence.

History
The incomplete painting may have been intended as a reference image for Bellini's workshop or an underdrawing for a full painting. It was given to Ferdinand III, Grand Duke of Tuscany by doge Alvise Giovanni Mocenigo in return for a pietra dura snuffbox, decorated with gold and gems. Later, the Grand Duke gave tempera painting to the Uffizi Gallery on 22 October 1798, where it is still on display.  

Critics have generally agreed that the painting was executed around the peak of Bellini's career, around the turn of the 16th century.

Description and style
The Lamentation is painted in chiaroscuro. The painting exhibits a graphic visual style upon wooden support. Although it looks like a monochromatic sketch, the painting displays a high degree of intention. The ground is not prepared but actually forms a layer of the painting.

Compared to other Pietà compositions by Bellini, the Lamentation is more crowded. The dead Christ is at the center of the painting in a seated position. He is supported on the side by an expressive Madonna and Saint John the Baptist. On the left, Mary Magdalene and Joseph of Arimthea are both recognizable. Above, three figures are painted more faintly: a girl, a bald, bearded man, and Nicodemus, the elderly monk with the long beard.

The protruding knees of Christ, foreshortened, break the illusion of the painting's separation from its viewer.

Bibliography

External links
Catalog entry

References

1500 paintings
Paintings by Giovanni Bellini
Paintings in the collection of the Uffizi
Bellini, Florence